Whanganui Girls' College is located in Jones Street Whanganui near the Dublin Street Bridge. The school is one of the oldest single sex educational facilities in New Zealand, founded in 1891.

Principals

Mary Isabel Fraser

Notable alumnae

Jackie Abraham-Lawrie (born 1974), rower
Monica Brewster (1886–1973), arts patron and women's rights advocate
Edith Collier (1885–1964), artist
Dorothy Davies (1899–1987), pianist
Ellen France (born 1956), lawyer and judge
Patricia France (1911–1995), artist
Nola Luxford (1901–1994), radio pioneer
Jennie McCormick (born 1963), astronomer 
Christine McElwee (1946–2022), politician, historian, author and teacher
Anne Noble (born 1954), photographer
Victoria Ransom, entrepreneur
Ruth Ross (1920–1982), historian
Gillian Weir (born 1941), organist

References

Schools in Whanganui
Secondary schools in Manawatū-Whanganui
Girls' schools in New Zealand
1891 establishments in New Zealand
Educational institutions established in 1891